80,000 (eighty thousand) is the natural number after 79,999 and before 80,001.

Selected numbers in the range 80,000–89,999

 80,286 = model number of the Intel 80286 chip
 80,386 = model number of the Intel 80386 chip
 82,467 = number of square (0,1)-matrices without zero rows and with exactly 6 entries equal to 1
 80,486 = model number of the Intel 80486 chip
 80,782 = Pell number P14
 82,000 = the only currently known number greater than 1 that can be written in bases from 2 through 5 using only 0s and 1s.
 82,025 = number of primes .
 82,656 = Kaprekar number: 826562 = 6832014336; 68320 + 14336 = 82656
 82,944 = 3-smooth number: 210 × 34
 83,097 = Riordan number
 83,160 = highly composite number
 83,357 = Friedman prime
 83,521 = 174
 84,187 – number of parallelogram polyominoes with 15 cells.
 85,085 = product of five consecutive primes: 5 × 7 × 11 × 13 × 17
 85,184 = 443
 86,400 = seconds in a day: 24 × 60 × 60 and common DNS default time to live
 87,360 = unitary perfect number
 88,888 = repdigit

See also
 80,000 Hours, a British career advisory service

References

80000